Adelomelon beckii, common name the Beck's volute, is a species of sea snail, a marine gastropod mollusk in the family Volutidae, the volutes.

Description
The length of the shell varies between 150 mm and 495 mm.

Distribution
This marine species occurs off the Atlantic coast of South America and off the Falkland Islands.

References

 Bail, P & Poppe, G. T. 2001. A conchological iconography: a taxonomic introduction of the recent Volutidae. Hackenheim-Conchbook, 30 pp, 5 pl.

External links
 

Volutidae
Gastropods described in 1836